Ponte di Piave is a comune (municipality) in the Province of Treviso in the Italian region Veneto, located about  northeast of Venice and about  northeast of Treviso.

Ponte di Piave borders the following municipalities: Breda di Piave, Chiarano, Maserada sul Piave, Oderzo, Ormelle, Salgareda, San Biagio di Callalta.

Twin towns
 Castelginest, France, since 1984

People
Marcello Bergamo (1946–), Italian cyclist born in Ponte di Piave
Antonio Gasparinetti (1777–1824), Italian poet and military officer born in Ponte di Piave 
Gino Paro (1910–1988), Italian prelate born in Ponte di Piave

References

Cities and towns in Veneto